Arseny Shurunov (born 26 May 1996) is a Russian chess player who holds the title of FIDE Master (FM) (2006).

Biography
Arseny Shurunov is a student of the Chelyabinsk chess school. He played for Russia in European Youth Chess Championships and World Youth Chess Championships in various age groups, achieving his best result in 2006 in Herceg Novi, where he won the European Youth Chess Championship in the U10 age group. For this success he was awarded the title of FIDE Master (FM). In 2008, Arseny Shurunov won the European Youth Rapid Chess Championship in the U12 age group.

References

External links

Arseny Shurunov chess games at 365chess.com

1996 births
Living people
Russian chess players
Chess FIDE Masters